Chenôve is a commune in the Côte-d'Or department in the Bourgogne-Franche-Comté region of France.

Until 1955, it was a small scale wine-growing village, when it was absorbed into the urban conglomeration of Dijon. It is now the most populous suburb of the city of Dijon, located adjacent to the city's southwest side.

With about 14,000 inhabitants, Chenôve is the third largest urban area in the Côte-d'Or and the second largest economy in Dijon. Local Cheneveliers (residents of Chenôve) call themselves the "bombis", which is patois for "good bread".

Geography

To the west of Chenôve, above the old town, is the Plateau of Chenôve, which reaches an altitude of 387 m. It has views of the city, its surroundings, and the distant plains of the Saône and Jura. In good weather it allows views of the contours of Mont Blanc. The plateau extends over 240 hectares with a great landscape diversity – alternating valleys, forests of Austrian pines, oak, ash, shrubland, and vast flat plains peppered with groves. It has rich Mediterranean flora.

In addition, there are the ancient limestone quarries in Chenôve, from which many of the monuments in Dijon were built.

Population

Administration 

List of Mayors (since 1978)
 Roland Carraz, Socialist Party, March 1978 - March 1995
 Roland Carraz, Citizen and Republican Movement, March 1995 - December 1999 (died in office)
 Jean Esmonin, Socialist Party, December 1999 – present

Wine 
The vineyards of Chenôve are part of the appellation d'origine contrôlée (AOC)  Marsannay.

Notable people

 Mark Karpelès, CEO of Mt. Gox

See also
Communes of the Côte-d'Or department

References

External links

Official website 

Communes of Côte-d'Or
Côte-d'Or communes articles needing translation from French Wikipedia